The 1201 Walnut Building is a Skyscraper located in Downtown Kansas City, Missouri, USA, built by HNTB Architects in 1991. Found at the intersection of 12th and Walnut streets, it is the eighth tallest habitable structure in the Kansas City Metropolitan Area, and the twelfth-tallest habitable structure in Missouri, at 427 feet. The exterior is made of mostly dark-colored glass, and granite panels, and is located one block North of the Power & Light District in downtown Kansas City. In late 2010, building tenant Stinson Leonard Street, LLP acquired the rights to place a large sign and corporate logo atop the southern face of the building.

See also
List of tallest buildings in Kansas City, Missouri

References

Sources
American Institute of Architects Guide to Kansas City Architecture & Public Art. (Copyright 2000). American Institute of Architects/KC. Retrieved August 11, 2007. (Page 30, Number 42)

External links
 1201 Walnut on Skyscraperpage.com

Skyscraper office buildings in Kansas City, Missouri

Office buildings completed in 1991